Karen Tso (born 13 September 1977) is an Australian television journalist and anchor at CNBC Europe.

Tso began her career as a general news reporter for the AAP after graduating with a commerce degree from Griffith University in Queensland. She also studied for a Masters In Journalism at both the University of Westminster in London and the University of Technology, Sydney before joining the Australian Broadcasting Corporation in 2002, where she became known to provide the business news in Lateline hosted by Tony Jones.

In 2005, she joined the Nine Network as a finance reporter and later as a presenter for the evening edition of Sky Business Report on Sky News Australia from 2006 - 2007. During her tenure at the ABC and Nine, she was also the horse racing correspondent in addition to duties as a finance reporter.

In October 2008, Tso left Nine News for CNBC Asia where she anchored Squawk Australia a one-hour show with the mission of delivering Australian business news to the world, and global business to Australia.

In early 2010, as part of a programming revamp, Tso moved to Singapore to take up a new role as co-anchor of Asia Squawk Box, along with veteran anchor Martin Soong and Bernard Lo. Tso also began co-anchoring a new one-hour morning show with Bernard Lo titled The Call.

At the start of 2012, Tso moved to CNBC Europe and is a co-anchor of Squawk Box Europe.

References

External links
ABC team profile

Living people
Australian journalists
Australian television presenters
Australian women journalists
Australian women television presenters
Australian people of Chinese descent
Griffith University alumni
Alumni of the University of Westminster
University of Technology Sydney alumni
1977 births